Gong Hongjia (born 1965), or known as his official Hong Kong transliteration Kung Hung Ka, is a Chinese billionaire businessman (with Hong Kong permanent resident status), vice-chairman and the second largest shareholder in Hikvision, a security equipment supplier. He was ranked 15 in the Forbes 2017 China Rich List, as well as 144th in 2021 Forbes billionaires list in May 2021, with a net worth of US$14.4 billion at that time.

Early life
Gong was born in mainland China in 1965. He was educated at Huazhong University of Science and Technology, graduating with a degree in computer science.

Career
Gong became a trader of electronic goods in Southern China (Guangzhou and British Hong Kong) after his graduation. He emigrated to Hong Kong in 1992, 5 years before the handover of the colony to China. He formerly owned radio manufacturer Tecsun (now known as Tecsun Science & Technology) and smart card company Watchdata. In 2001, he co-invested in Hikvision for 49% stake.

Gong also owned Wealth Strategy Holding, which in turn partly owned another listed company Yichang HEC Changjiang Pharmaceutical in 2015.

Gong was also actively invested in the property market of Hong Kong.

Personal life
He is married with two children and lives in Hong Kong.

References 

1964 births
Living people
Chinese billionaires
Huazhong University of Science and Technology alumni
Chinese company founders
20th-century Chinese businesspeople
21st-century Chinese businesspeople